The Look of Love is a 2013 British biopic of Paul Raymond, directed by Michael Winterbottom. It stars Steve Coogan as Raymond. The film was released in the United Kingdom on 26 April 2013.

Plot
The story opens in London in 1992. Paul Raymond returns to his flat, after attending the funeral of his daughter, Debbie. Raymond plays a videotape of a television programme he and Debbie took part in, and reflects on their lives. In a flashback to the end of the 1950s, Raymond is an impresario, on the seaside variety show circuit, where he is making a name for himself, by adding semi nude women to his stage acts.

After a lion attacks the show's dancers, his wife Jean joins the show. When the Daily Sketch claims that Jean performed nude, Raymond sues the newspaper unsuccessfully, but appreciates the ensuing publicity, after which Raymond launches his strip club in London, the Raymond Revue Bar. Its success allows him to expand his property empire, and also indulge in a playboy lifestyle, which his wife tolerates.

In the beginning of the 1970s, Raymond moves into theatrical revues, and casts aspiring actress Amber St. George in a nude revue. Raymond moves in with her, and his marriage to Jean ends. Raymond also agrees to meet a grown son, Derry, he sired out of wedlock, but after an awkward dinner together, he gives Derry no more of his time. Tony Power is approached by Paul Raymond to run a new men's magazine, Men Only.

Tony Power, who was only in his 20s at the time, was subsequently corrupted into a sleazy world by Paul Raymond, ending in his untimely demise. The magazine is a huge success, in part thanks to roving sex reporter Fiona Richmond, the pseudonym of St. George. Raymond continues to enjoy a hedonistic, coke fuelled lifestyle. This becomes too much for St. George, and their relationship ends.

Into this mix, his daughter Debbie is introduced. Initially, Raymond tries to make her a star in his theatrical ventures, but she lacks talent, and the show is an unprecedented failure for her.

Debbie marries musician Jonathan Hodge. Jean returns for the wedding, and volunteers to pose nude for Raymond's magazine. In the delivery room, Debbie gives birth to a girl, after sniffing a line of coke, that her father provides. She dies in 1992, of a heroin overdose. After the funeral, Raymond returns home with his granddaughter, pointing out the property he owns that will someday belong to her.

An epilogue reveals that in December 1992, he was the richest man in Britain.

Cast

Production history
The Look of Love was originally called The King of Soho, until that title had to be dropped due to a legal dispute.

Critical response

On Rotten Tomatoes, the film has an approval rating of 54%, based on reviews from 74 critics, with an average score of 5.7 out of 10. The site's consensus reads: "While it may not add up to the definitive Paul Raymond biopic -- or take full advantage of Steve Coogan's many gifts -- The Look of Love still proves an entertainingly old fashioned look at the Swinging London of the 1960s." On Metacritic, it has a score of 57 out of 100, based on reviews from 20 critics, indicating "mixed or average reviews".

Dennis Harvey of Variety wrote: "Michael Winterbottom and Steve Coogan's fourth feature collaboration is a vivid period whirlwind, that impressively showcases the comic thesp's more dramatic side." Peter Bradshaw of The Guardian called it "a shallow, but watchable movie" and gave it three out of five stars.

When the film was released in the United Kingdom, it opened on #7, with £208,557.

Imogen Poots was featured on the inaugural longlist of the Guardian Film Awards, nominated for Best Supporting Actor, in January 2014.

References

External links
 Official Facebook page
 
 

2013 films
2013 biographical drama films
British biographical drama films
2010s English-language films
Films about adult magazine publishers (people)
Cultural depictions of publishers
Cultural depictions of British men
Film4 Productions films
Films directed by Michael Winterbottom
Films set in London
Films set in the 1960s
Films set in the 1970s
Films set in the 1980s
2010s British films